Chan Wa-yen (born 7 April 1946) is a Taiwanese boxer. He competed in the men's flyweight event at the 1968 Summer Olympics.

References

1946 births
Living people
Taiwanese male boxers
Olympic boxers of Taiwan
Boxers at the 1968 Summer Olympics
Sportspeople from Taipei
Flyweight boxers
20th-century Taiwanese people